Allium pseudoalbidum is a species of onion that is endemic to Kars Province in Turkey. It can be found in montane steppe at about 1,900 m elevation. It is threatened by overgrazing, hay making and deforestation.

References

pseudoalbidum
Endangered plants
Endemic flora of Turkey